Sherman Avenue is a collector road in the lower portion of Hamilton, Ontario, Canada. It begins at the Niagara Escarpment (the mountain) just south of Cumberland Avenue and is a one-way street bisecting the industrialized northern neighbourhoods of the city. It ends at Ship Street — the site of Steel Company of Canada (Stelco).

The Sherman Access is the only mountain access with time restrictions. The pass opens every Monday to Friday during rush hour. The northbound is open to traffic for the morning rush; while the southbound is open to traffic during the afternoon rush. The rest of the time, it operates as a regular two-lane road.

History
Sherman Avenue, originally called Shearman Avenue which was named after the first land assessor of the district, nothing more is known of Shearman who remains a man of mystery in Hamilton's history books. Later the name was changed from Shearman to Sherman Avenue in honour of brothers Clifton Sherman (1872–1955) and Frank Sherman (1887–1967), who both founded Dominion Foundries and Steel (later called Dofasco) in 1912, creating a giant that would bring prosperity and identity to the city.

The steel industry continued to grow in the late 19th century through to the early 20th century and finally consolidate through this period, some combining to form the Steel Company of Canada (Stelco) in 1910. Dominion Steel Casting Company (Dofasco) was established two years later in 1912. Later named Dominion Foundries and Steel, the company merged with its subsidiary, Hamilton Steel Wheel Company in 1917. The name was officially changed to Dofasco Inc. in 1980.

On July 15, 1946, after a meeting at the Playhouse Theatre, on Sherman Avenue North, Local 1005 members of the United Steelworkers of America at Stelco marched to the plant gates to start the famous strike of 1946. The fight was over Union recognition, a 40-hour work week and wages. With the help of Hamilton's community this struggle changed Canadian Labour history. It forced employers to accept collective bargaining and helped start a mass trade union movement in Canada.

St. Peter's Hospital is a 250-bed chronic care hospital located on Maplewood Avenue 3 blocks east of Sherman Avenue South in downtown Hamilton, Ontario specializing in the care of older adults.  The hospital is a part of the St. Peter's Family of Services, which also includes home care, long-term care, and research branches. It was founded by the Anglican Church in 1890.

Landmarks
Note: Listing of Landmarks from North to South.
Pier 16
Hamilton Port Authority
Stelco (Steel Company of Canada), Piers 16, 17, 18 (Sherman Avenue to Ottawa Street)
Fine Line Signs Company
Barton Air Fabrications Inc.
Szabo Carbidde Tooling, Precision tools and die manufacturing (formerly Italian Evangelical Church, 1910–1929)
Newalta, (Canada's leading industrial waste management and environmental services company)
Mermaid Limo Service
Canadian National railway tracks
Hamilton Hydro Electric System building
Hamilton Specialty Bar Corporation (formerly Slater Steel)
270 Sherman (former Imperial Cotton Company cotton mill)
The Wallace Barnes Company Limited building
Metal Industrial Corp.
Canadian National railway tracks
Bethal Apostolic Church
Playhouse Theatre building
St. Ann's Rectory
St. Peter's Hospital, (off Sherman Avenue, 3 blocks east on Maplewood Avenue)
Cumberland Christian Assembly Church
Canadian National railway tracks
Escarpment Rail Trail (abandoned railway path)
Bruce Trail
Mountain Face Park
Niagara Escarpment (mountain)
Mountain Face Park
Escarpment Rail Trail

Communities

Note: Listing of neighbourhoods from North to South 
Northend - Everything north of the Canadian National Railway tracks
Gibson/ Stipeley, Sherman Avenue is the division between these two neighbourhoods.
St. Clair/ Blakeley, Sherman Avenue is the division between these two neighbourhoods.

Gallery

See also
Sherman Access
Upper Sherman Avenue
Niagara Escarpment Commission

References

MapArt Golden Horseshoe Atlas - Page 647 - Grids E15, F15, G15, H15

External links
North End Neighbours
270 Sherman creative complex
Bruce Trail Association
Hikes on the Bruce Trail
Google Maps: Sherman Avenue (Hybrid)

Roads in Hamilton, Ontario
Roads with a reversible lane